Christopher K. Zarins (born on  in Tukums, Latvia) is an American-Latvian surgeon and professor emeritus who specializes in vascular biology and pathology.

Family background and education 
Zarins was born during the Second World War in 1943 in the family of Tukums Lutheran pastor Rihards Zariņš (1913–2006) and English teacher Maria Zarinš. In October 1944 he fled to Sweden with his parents and in November 1946 he moved to the United States.

In 1960, he graduated from the Brooklyn Technical High School in New York, in 1964 he graduated from Lehigh University with B.A. in biology. In 1968, he received his Doctor of Medicine (M.D.) degree from Johns Hopkins University in Baltimore.

From 1968 to 1973 he worked at the Johns Hopkins Hospital, from 1974 to 1979 at the US Navy Medical Center in San Diego. From 1976 to 1993 he taught at the University of Chicago, was a vascular surgeon at the Medical Center, in 1982 he became a professor. In 1993, he moved to California where he began working as a vascular surgeon at Stanford University Medical Center.

Scientific work 
Zarins is an author or co-author of more than 15 books and more than 350 scientific articles in the fields of vascular biomechanics and pathobiology of atherosclerosis, carotid stenosis, aortic aneurysms and endovascular therapy.

HeartFlow 
In 2007, Zarins together with biomedical engineer Charles Anthony Taylor founded HeartFlow, Inc., a medical technology company based in Redwood City, California, that developed non-invasive, real-time virtual modeling tool for coronary artery disease (CAD) intervention using estimation of fractional flow reserve (FFR).

References

External links 
 Christopher Zarins - Stanford Profiles
 HeartFlow website

American people of Latvian descent
Latvian physicians
1943 births
Brooklyn Technical High School alumni
Lehigh University alumni
Johns Hopkins University alumni
Stanford University School of Medicine faculty
Living people
21st-century American businesspeople
American technology company founders
Businesspeople from the San Francisco Bay Area